Sergio Martínez may refer to:

Sergio Martínez (boxer) (born 1975), Argentine boxer
Sergio Martínez (cyclist) (1943–1979), Cuban Olympic cyclist
Sergio Martínez (swimmer) (born 1936), Colombian Olympic swimmer
Sergio Martínez (footballer) (born 1969), Uruguayan footballer
Sergio Martínez Ballesteros (born 1975), Spanish footballer
Sergio Castro Martínez (born 1941), Mexican humanitarian